Arjun Patiala is a 2019 Indian Hindi-language action spoof film directed by Rohit Jugraj. Produced by Bhushan Kumar, Krishan Kumar, Dinesh Vijan and Sandeep Leyzell under T-Series, Maddock Films and Bake My Cake Films, it stars Diljit Dosanjh, Kriti Sanon and Varun Sharma. The narrative revolves around a newly appointed police officer who attempts to curb crime and corruption in his town with the help of his sidekick.

The film was theatrically released in India on 26 July 2019.

Plot 
A director meets a producer, and he queries about all elements of a masala film (songs, villain, fights, comedy scenes, etc.) and approves it without even reading the script.

The director insists on reading out the script to him, to which the producer agrees. The script is about Arjun Patiala, who wins the national Judo championship. As a reward, he is offered the post of an Inspector, and he takes charge of Ferozpur police station, where Onida Singh, a constable, becomes his sidekick. He earns the respect of his colleagues on the first day with his wit and integrity. There is a rendezvous with Baby Narula, and as the director narrates, there is a needless item song inserted for entertainment.

Sometime later, he meets Ritu Randhawa, a journalist, and sparks fly between them. The next day  DSP Amarjeet Singh Gill visits their police station and tells Arjun that crime free district is his dream. A local drug lord Baldev Singh Rana thrashes the constable from his station. Ritu expecting ignorance from the police for this incident, reaches the crime spot and berates the police for inaction. Arjun Singh also reaches the place and trashes the Baldev, and arrests him. Ritu is impressed, and they start dating.

Arjun Singh meets her in her office and gets information on the crime scene of the district. She explains to him of rivalry between Baladev and Dilbaugh and Sakool, an emerging crime lord.

With limited resources and legal constraints, Arjun decides to instigate a gang war amongst the gangs, which is the only way to eliminate the criminals. He gives Sakool the location of Baladev, and he kills him in the presence of roadside vendors and Arjun Singh. At media briefing, police claims there were no witnesses. Ritu believes that there have to be witnesses because the murder occurred at a busy street, she investigates and smells something fishy. She meets Arjun and expresses her concerns, and asks him to be honest with her. He lies to her that he has no role to play in this. DSP Gill introduces Arjun to MLA Makkad, who also appears to be upright and supports their action.

One by one, all the gangsters are killed except Sakool. Ritu is suspicious of all these gang wars and finally confronts Arjun. She offers him 2 choices, either she investigates all the killings, or they separate, which leads to their break-up. She meets Sakool and tells him about her suspicions, and tries to alert him of his possible death. Sakool tries to kill her because of her intricate knowledge of the crime world & she can become a possible witness to his plan of double-crossing the Police, but somehow she manages to escape.

While following a lead on Ritu's editor, Onida enters the home of Makkad and sees DSP Gill with the editor discussing their plans to take over the vacuum in the criminal world. Realising they are being toyed, he tries to alert Arjun. However, his cover is exposed, and he has to run for his life. The trio (MLA, DSP & editor) visit Arjun Singh, and Makkad gives him an ultimatum to kill Sakool and Onida. She further tells him that she would personally inspect their dead bodies in the morgue. Arjun calls Onida & asks him to meet near a bridge and shoots him in front of Makkad. Later in the day, he calls her to  the morgue to inspect the bodies of Sakool & Onida. When she arrives at the morgue, Sakool and Onida shows up alive, and Arjun has double-crossed both Makkad and Sakool. There is a fist fight at the scene, and Arjun is able to escape with DSP Gill and Onida. Sakool and Makkad also escape in the morgue van. Sakool chases Arjun to his ancestral home, and after a long cat and mouse chase, Sakool is shot dead when his father accidentally fires Arjun's gun. Makkad is sent to jail, Arjun and Ritu reconcile, and there is a happy ending as expected of a Masala Film.

Cast
 Diljit Dosanjh as Sub-Inspector Arjun Singh aka Arjun Patiala
 Kriti Sanon as Reporter Ritu Randhawa
 Varun Sharma as Head Constable Onida Singh
 Ronit Roy as IPS Amarjeet Singh Gill
 Pankaj Tripathi as Producer
 Seema Pahwa as MLA Prapti Makkad
 Mohammed Zeeshan Ayyub as Sakool
 Amit Mehra as Baldev Singh Rana
 Yogesh Upadhyay as Danda
 Biswapati Sarkar as Editor
 Himanshu Kohli as Dilbaugh Singh
 Ritesh Shah as Arjun's father
 Nirmal Rishi as Arjun's mother
 Sumit Gulati as Anda
 Mithilesh Chaturvedi as Bhatia Ji
 Ankush Kulshreshtha as Kundan
 Manvendra Tripathi as Dalbir Singh
 Tajender Singh as Gagandeep Mishra
 Pradeep Singh as Ajeet Singh
 Akshay Joshi as Kala Jamun
 Rajeev Tiwari as Doctor
 Jaspal Sandhu as ASI Kartar
 Nikita Grover as Nikki Ahuja
 Bharat Bhatia as Sukhi Bajwa
 Gurmeet Chawla as Jailor
 Sunny Leone as Baby Narula
 * Surya sivakumar as Rajinikanth (special appearance)
(2 roles as it's a film inside film)
 Abhishek Banerjee as director.
 Santosh Anand Pandey as PA of Producer
 Radhika Pandit as Margharet, Arjun Patiala's and Ritu Randhawa's colleague (special appearance)
Allu arjun as Bunty (special appearance)
Prabhas as Dr. Gopal Raj (special appearance

Production
The story is written by Ritesh Shah.

Principal photography began in February 2018 and ended in July 2018. It was shot in Chandigarh and some areas of Punjab.

Soundtrack

The music is composed by Sachin–Jigar, Akash D and Guru Randhawa, with lyrics by Guru Randhawa, Priya Saraiya and Akash D.

The first song released was Main Deewana Tera, performed by Guru Randhawa.

Marketing and release
The film was supposed to open on 13 September 2018 but was first postponed to 3 May 2019, then to 19 July and finally to 26 July.

Dinesh Vijan of Maddock Films has stated that the film won't be released in Pakistan due to the Pulwama Attack that happened in Kashmir, India.

Reception

Critical response
Ronak Kotecha of The Times of India rated the film 2/5 stars, noting that in the second half, the writing, direction, and execution seemed childish. He felt the music was average except for one number. In concluding, Kotecha wrote, "Spoof comedies can be a tricky affair, and this one is way too underwhelming to tickle your funny bone for full two hours." Jyoti Sharma Bawa of the Hindustan Times gave 1/5 stars and felt that Shah and  Leyzell's script failed and the film was lost between 'a parody and just another run-of-the-mill film'. Bawa opined, "Spoof as a genre has rarely been tried in Hindi cinema, and someone needs to crack that egg – heaven knows there is a lot waiting to be explored; Arjun Patiala, alas, isn’t that film." Devesh Sharma reviewing for Filmfare rated the film with 2.5/5 stars, praising the supporting cast of Seema Pahwa, Ronit Roy, and Mohammed Zeeshan Ayyub. He wrote, "More was expected from the film, but it just doesn’t aim high enough ... the ingredients are all there, but the execution isn’t up to mark. The film kind of over-promises but under-delivers."

Box office
Arjun Patiala had the opening day collection of 1.25 crore and the second day collection of 1.50 crore, whereas the third day collection was 1.75 crores, taking its total opening weekend collection to 4.50 crore. The opening week gross of the film was 9.18 crore.

, with a gross of 7.88 crore in India and 1.38 crore overseas, the film has a worldwide gross collection of 9.26 crore.

References

External links
 
 
 

2019 films
2010s Hindi-language films
Films with screenplays by Ritesh Shah
Indian action comedy films
Indian slapstick comedy films
Indian parody films
Indian police films
T-Series (company) films
Hindi-language comedy films
Films scored by Guru Randhawa
Films scored by Sachin–Jigar
2019 action comedy films